The Herbissonne is a small stream in the Aube department in the Grand Est region of north-eastern France. It flows into the river Aube near Champigny-sur-Aube.

Geography
The Herbissonne starts in the village of Villiers-Herbisse and flows into the river Aube after crossing the villages of Herbisse, Allibaudières and finally Champigny-sur-Aube.

References

Rivers of Aube
Rivers of Grand Est
Rivers of France